Tristan Dekker (born 27 March 1998) is a Dutch professional footballer who plays as a right-back for VVV-Venlo in the Eerste Divisie.

Club career

Early years
Born in The Hague, Dekker joined the ADO Den Haag youth academy as a seven-year-old from RVC/Rijswijk, and progressed through the youth teams. On 13 March 2014, he signed his first professional contract with ADO.

VVV-Venlo
Two years later, on 29 June 2016, Dekker joined VVV-Venlo on a two-year contract with an option for an additional season, reuniting him with former ADO manager Maurice Steijn. On 12 August 2016, aged 18, Dekker made his professional debut in a 2–1 away win over MVV Maastricht in the Eerste Divisie, replacing Torino Hunte in the 89th minute. 

In September 2017, Dekker was sidelined for several months with appendicitis that kept him sidelined for months. At the end of March 2018, the club opted to extend his contract to 2019.

In May 2019, the two parties agreed on a new two-year contract, and at the end of March 2021, VVV terminated his expiring contract, but after suffering relegation from the Eredivisie in May 2021, the club reopened negotiations. With an offer from fellow relegation candidate Emmen, Dekker signed a new two-year deal with VVV on 5 July 2021.

In the 2021–22 season, his sixth season for VVV, Dekker scored his first goal in professional football. During a 2–1 away loss to Volendam on 17 September 2021, he completed a solo-run with a strike from distance which found the back of the net. On 13 February 2022, Dekker broke his fibula in a home derby against Roda JC Kerkrade after a collision with Davy van den Berg, leaving him sidelined for months.

On 11 November 2022, Dekker made his 100th league appearance for VVV in the 0–0 home draw against Willem II.

International career
Dekker was born in the Netherlands to a Dutch father, and a South Korean mother. He played four matches for the Netherlands U16.

Career statistics

Honours
VVV-Venlo
 Eerste Divisie: 2016–17

References

External links
 

1998 births
Living people
Footballers from The Hague
Association football fullbacks
Dutch footballers
Netherlands youth international footballers
Dutch people of South Korean descent
ADO Den Haag players
VVV-Venlo players
Eredivisie players
Eerste Divisie players